Melville Koppies is a nature reserve and a Johannesburg City Heritage Site in Johannesburg, South Africa. The word 'koppie' means small hill.

Iron Age artefacts can still be found at the site. Visitors can walk or hike in the Koppies, and tours are offered. Neighbouring it is the Johannesburg Botanical Garden.

History 
In 1963 Revil Mason, excavating at the Koppies, found an Iron Age furnace for smelting iron ore, either in a bowl or sunken furnace with carbon dating of charcoal found at varies levels at the site shows it would have been in use at various times between 1060AD and 1580AD. Another more modern Iron Age furnace was found on the northern slopes dating to the 18th/19th centuries.

See also 

 Melville, Johannesburg

External links 

 http://www.mk.org.za/
 https://joburgheritage.org.za/index.html

References 

Tourist attractions in Johannesburg
Archaeological sites in South Africa
Archaeological sites of Southern Africa
Gauteng Parks
Protected areas of South Africa